NGC 4297 is a lenticular galaxy located about 200 million light-years away in the constellation Virgo. It was discovered by astronomer William Herschel on April 13, 1784. It forms an interacting pair with NGC 4296.

See also 
 List of NGC objects (4001–5000)

References

External links 

4297
1-32-18
39940
Virgo (constellation)
Astronomical objects discovered in 1784
Lenticular galaxies
Interacting galaxies
Discoveries by William Herschel